Apiocera alastor is a species of fly in the family Apioceridae.

Distribution
South Africa.

References

Asiloidea
Insects described in 1849
Diptera of Africa
Taxa named by Francis Walker (entomologist)